Christophia ectypella is a species of snout moth in the genus Christophia. It was described by Ragonot in 1888. It is found in Russia.

References

Moths described in 1888
Phycitini